Nitroanisole can refer to any of the three possible isomers of nitroanisole:

o-Nitroanisole (2-nitroanisole)
m-Nitroanisole (3-nitroanisole)
p-Nitroanisole (4-nitroanisole)